Dávid Petrík (born 14 June 2005) is a Slovak footballer who currently plays for Fortuna Liga club Zemplín Michalovce.

Club career

Zemplín Michalovce
Petrík made his Slovak league debut for Zemplín Michalovce in an away fixture against at NTC Poprad against Tatran Liptovský Mikuláš on 8 April 2022. Petrík came on in second-half stoppage time to replace Alex Méndez with the final score already set at 3-1 in favour of season's top-division debutants Tatran.

References

External links
 
 
 Futbalnet profile 

2005 births
Living people
People from Sečovce
Sportspeople from the Košice Region
Slovak footballers
Slovakia youth international footballers
Association football forwards
MFK Zemplín Michalovce players
Slovak Super Liga players